Bobbarlanka  is a village in Atreyapuram Mandal, located in East Godavari district of the Indian state of Andhra Pradesh.

References 

Villages in East Godavari district